Visa requirements for Vatican citizens are administrative entry restrictions by the authorities of other states placed on citizens of Vatican City. As of 2 July 2019, Vatican citizens had visa-free or visa on arrival access to 148 countries and territories, ranking the Vatican passport 28th in terms of travel freedom according to the Henley Passport Index.

Visa requirements map

Visa requirements

Dependent, or restricted territories
Visa requirements for Vatican citizens for visits to various territories, and restricted zones:

Dependent and autonomous territories

See also

 Visa policy of Vatican City
 Visa policy of the Schengen Area
 Vatican passport

References and Notes
References

Notes

Vatican